This is a list of breweries in Armenia. Beer has been produced in Armenia since ancient times.

Breweries
As of July 2018, the following brewing companies are operating in Armenia:

Beer of Yerevan Brewery

Opened in 1952, it is the largest brewery in Armenia. Currently, several types of beer are produced and bottled by the brewery:
Kilikia Lager, pale lager, 4.8% ABV
Kilikia 1952, pale lager, 4.8% ABV
Kilikia 11, pale lager, 4.6% ABV
Kilikia Elitar, pale lager, 5.6% ABV
Kilikia Jubilee, pale lager, 5.1% ABV
Kilikia Light, pale lager, 4.5% ABV
Kilikia Youth, pale lager, 4.8% ABV
Kilikia Dark, Oktoberfestbier/Märzen, 12% wort extract, 4.4% ABV
Kilikia Tonakan/Celebratory, premium lager, 5.3% ABV
Yerevan Premium, pale lager, 4.8% ABV
Yerevan Zhigulyovskoe, pale lager, 5% ABV
Hayer, pilsner, 4.9% ABV
12.06 Premium, pale lager, 4.8% ABV

Gyumri Beer Brewery
Gyumri, Ararat and Aleksandrapol from the Gyumri Beer brewery, located in Gyumri. Opened in 1970, it is the second largest brewery in Armenia. However, the old brewery of Gyumri dates back to 1898. Currently, seven types of pale lager beer are produced by the brewery under the Gyumri, Ararat and Aleksandrapol labels:
Aleksandrapol, pale lager, 4.5% ABV
Ararat, bitter pale lager, 12% wort extract, 4.5% ABV
Gyumri Czech, pilsner, 4.5% ABV
Gyumri Gold, pale lager, 13% wort extract, 4.7% ABV
Gyumri Extra, pale lager, 7% ABV
Gyumri Unfiltered Beer, unfiltered pale lager, 4.7% ABV
Hndkadzawar, unfiltered pale lager, 4.7% ABV
Red Limited, dark lager, 4.1% ABV

Kotayk Brewery

Kotayk, Erebuni and Urartu from the Kotayk Brewery, located in Abovyan. Opened in 1974, it is the third largest brewery in Armenia. Currently, five types of lager beer are produced by the brewery:
Kotayk, pale lager, 5.2% ABV
Kotayk Gold, pale lager, 5.6% ABV
Kotayk Tshani, pale lager, 5.2% ABV
Erebuni, strong lager, 6.4% ABV
Erebuni 14, pale lager, 4.8% ABV
Urartu, pale lager, 4% ABV

Lihnitis Sevan Brewery
Kellers from the Lihnitis Sevan Brewery, located in Sevan. Opened in 2007, currently one type of lager beer is produced by the brewery that is sold in bottles:
Kellers, pale lager, 11.5% wort extract, 4.4% ABV
The brewery also produces three types of lager that are only available in the brewery's pub (draught beer):
Kellers Gold Draught, unfiltered pale lager, 11.5% wort extract, 4.4% ABV
Kellers Gold Filtered, pale lager, unpasteurized, 11.5% wort extract, 4.4% ABV
Kellers Dark Draught, dunkel, unfiltered, 13% wort extract, 4.8% ABV

Hayasy Group
Hayasy from the Hayasy Group, located in Voskevaz. Opened in 2011, currently three types of lager beer are produced and bottled by the brewery:
Hayasy Classic, premium lager, 4.5% ABV
Hayasy Black, black beer
Hayasy Exclusive, pale lager, 4.4% ABV

Dilijan Brewery

Dilijan from the Dilijan Brewery, located in Dilijan. Opened in 2016, the brewery currently produces:
 Dilijan 1, non-alcoholic lager, 0% ABV
Dilijan 1, pale lager, 12% wort extract, 4.6% ABV
 Dilijan 2, pale lager, 12% wort extract, 4.9% ABV
 Dilijan 3, wheat beer, 12.5% wort extract, 4.4% ABV
 Dilijan 4, dark lager, 13% wort extract, 5% ABV
Dilijan 5, pale lager, 4.7% ABV

Dargett Brewery

Dargett Beer from the Dargett Brewery near Abovyan. Opened in 2016 in Yerevan as a brewpub, it currently produces and serves a large variety of unfiltered beer made in the brewery opened in 2019:
Dargett Steppenwolf, Bavarian weizen, 20 IBU, 5% ABV
Dargett La Rapsodia, Bohemian pilsner, 42 IBU, 5% ABV
Dargett Belle De Jour, blonde ale, 20 IBU, 5% ABV
Dargett What The Hell, Münich light lager, 22 IBU, 5% ABV
Dargett Metamorphosis, Vienna lager, 22 IBU, 5.5% ABV
Dargett The Catcher In The Wheat, American wheat ale, 25 IBU, 4.6% ABV
Dargett Coney Island, American pale ale, 40 IBU, 5.5% ABV
Dargett Vertigo, India pale ale, 60 IBU, 7% ABV
Dargett Armenia Invicta, Imperial IPA, 95 IBU, 8.5% ABV
Dargett Milestones, black IPA, 60 IBU, 7.5% ABV
Dargett Uncle Raffi's, apple cider, 5.6% ABV
Dargett Morello, cherry ale, 18 IBU, 6% ABV
Dargett Prunus Armeniaca, apricot ale, 18 IBU, 6% ABV
Dargett Seven Sins, Belgian tripel, 25 IBU, 8% ABV
Dargett 1984, nitro oatmeal stout, 30 IBU, 4.8% ABV
Dargett Odin, Baltic porter, 30 IBU, 7% ABV
Dargett Woland, Russian Imperial stout, 70 IBU, 10% ABV
Dargett Underdog, vegetable beer, 6% ABV
Dargett Belgian Blanche, witbier, 18 IBU, 4.8% ABV
Dargett You Have To Try It, New England IPA, 35 IBU, 6.5% ABV
Dargett Dream #9, American red ale, 5% ABV
Dargett Pumpkin, pumpkin ale, 20 IBU, 5% ABV.

Microbreweries/Brewpubs
As of 2019, there are six microbreweries/brewpubs that produce and serve draught beer in Armenia:

Alaverdi Draft Beer
Alaverdi Beer from the Alaverdi Draft Beer microbrewery in Alaverdi, Lori Province. Opened in 1947, it currently serves many types of unfiltered beer in several pubs throughout Armenia.

AM Group
Jäger Beer Armenia and Roskvas from the AM Group microbrewery in Tairov, Armavir Province. Opened in 1998, it currently serves the Jäger Armenia unfiltered beer and Roskvas kvass (Slavic and Baltic fermented beverage) in several pubs throughout Armenia.

Blonder Beer House and Brewery
Blonder Beer from the Blonder Beer House and Brewery in Yerevan. Opened in 2000, it currently serves 3 types of the Blonder Slovak pilsner unfiltered beer produced in the complex.

Beer Academy Yerevan

Academia Beer from the Beer Academy brewpub in Yerevan. Opened in 2012, it currently serves 7 types of unfiltered beer produced in the brewpub:
Academia Pils, pale lager, 12% wort extract, 4.5% ABV
Academia Bitter, bitter semi-dark, 11% wort extract, 4.3% ABV
Academia Dunkel, dunkel, 12% wort extract, 4.8% ABV
Academia Ginger, lager ginger beer, 12.5% wort extract, 4.7% ABV
Academia Hot, warm dunkel, 16.5% wort extract, 2.5% ABV
Academia Weizen, wheat beer, 11% wort extract, 4.3% ABV (seasonal, May to October)
Academia Weizen Bock, wheat beer dark, 13.7 wort extract, 7% ABV (seasonal, October to May)

Tovmas Craft Beer
Tovmas Beer from the Tovmas Craft Beer in Yerevan. Opened in 2016, it currently produces two types of unfiltered beer:
Tovmas Light
Tovmas Dark

Vladimir Hakobyan Brewery
Dovegh's unfiltered beer from the Vladimir Hakobyan Microbrewery, located in the Dovegh village of Tavush Province. Opened in 2017, the microbrewery currently produces:
Dovegh's, dark unfiltered, 5% ABV

See also
Beer in Armenia
Beer and breweries by region
Armenian wine

References

Armenian cuisine
Industry in Armenia